Logan Norman Seavey (born June 9, 1997) is an American professional stock car racing driver. He currently competes part-time in the World of Outlaws NOS Energy Drink Sprint Car Series, driving the No. 5B for Chase Briscoe Racing and full-time in the USAC P1 Insurance National Midget Championship for Keith Kunz Motorsports driving the No. 67 with support from Toyota Racing Development.

After winning the 2017 POWRi National Midget championship, he won the 2018 USAC National Midget championship in his rookie season. He won the 2021 Turkey Night Grand Prix race.

Racing career

NASCAR

Camping World Truck Series
Seavey made his NASCAR Camping World Truck Series debut on July 18, 2018 in the No. 51 for Kyle Busch Motorsports. After leading 53 laps and seeming to have raced the win away, a caution came out to bring out overtime which in turn shuffled Seavey back to 8th where he finished.

ARCA Racing Series
Seavey made his debut in the ARCA Racing Series at the Illinois State Fairgrounds Racetrack for Venturini Motorsports where he qualified in 4th and went on to finish 3rd. Two races later Seavey returned with Venturini Motorsports and won his first career ARCA race at the DuQuoin State Fairgrounds Racetrack after dominating the majority of the end of the race.

USAC National Midgets 

Seavey currently competes full-time in the USAC Midgets in the No. 67 for Keith Kunz Motorsports. He also drives the No. 5B sprint car for Briscoe Racing on a limited basis. In 2018, Logan Seavey won the USAC National Midget Championship and that made him just the third series rookie to win the USAC National Midget championship, joining Danny Caruthers in 1971 and Christopher Bell in 2013. Seavey won the 2021 Turkey Night Grand Prix. It was his second national midget win of the season and eighth of his career. The win made him the first driver to sweep of winning the final race of the season for all three USAC national series (also Silver Crown and Sprint cars).

USAC National Sprints 
On, August 23, 2019 Seavey picked up his first USAC National Sprint win at the Kokomo Speedway with Reinbold/Underwood Racing.

POWRi National Midget League 

Seavey has competed part-time in the POWRi National Midget League in the No. 67 for Keith Kunz Motorsports. In 2017 in his rookie season Seavey recorded 2 victories and the championship.

Motorsports career results

NASCAR
(key) (Bold – Pole position awarded by qualifying time. Italics – Pole position earned by points standings or practice time. * – Most laps led.)

Camping World Truck Series

ARCA Menards Series
(key) (Bold – Pole position awarded by qualifying time. Italics – Pole position earned by points standings or practice time. * – Most laps led.)

 Season still in progress
 Ineligible for series points

References

External links
 

Living people
1997 births
People from Sutter County, California
World of Outlaws drivers
NASCAR drivers
ARCA Menards Series drivers
USAC Silver Crown Series drivers